The 150th New York State Legislature, consisting of the New York State Senate and the New York State Assembly, met from January 5 to March 25, 1927, during the fifth year of Al Smith's second tenure as Governor of New York, in Albany.

Background
Under the provisions of the New York Constitution of 1894, re-apportioned in 1917, 51 Senators and 150 assemblymen were elected in single-seat districts; senators for a two-year term, assemblymen for a one-year term. The senatorial districts consisted either of one or more entire counties; or a contiguous area within a single county. The counties which were divided into more than one senatorial district were New York (nine districts), Kings (eight), Bronx (three), Erie (three), Monroe (two), Queens (two) and Westchester (two). The Assembly districts were made up of contiguous area, all within the same county.

At this time there were two major political parties: the Republican Party and the Democratic Party. The Socialist Party, the Prohibition Party, the Workers Party and the Socialist Labor Party also nominated tickets.

Elections
The New York state election, 1926, was held on November 2. Governor Al Smith (Dem.) was re-elected. Lieutenant Governor Seymour Lowman (Rep.) was defeated for re-election by Smith's running mate Edwin Corning (Dem.). Of the other five statewide elective offices, three were carried by Democrats and two by Republicans. The approximate party strength at this election, as expressed by the vote for Governor, was: Democrats 1,520,000; Republicans 1,280,000; Socialists 83,000; Prohibition 21,000; Workers 5,500; and Socialist Labor 3,500.

Assemblywoman Rhoda Fox Graves (Rep.), of Gouverneur, a former school teacher who after her marriage became active in women's organisations and politics, was re-elected, and remained the only woman legislator.

Sessions
The Legislature met for the regular session at the State Capitol in Albany on January 5, 1927; and adjourned on March 25.

Joseph A. McGinnies (Rep.) was re-elected Speaker.

John Knight (Rep.) was re-elected Temporary President of the State Senate.

State Senate

Districts

Members
The asterisk (*) denotes members of the previous Legislature who continued in office as members of this Legislature. Alfred J. Kennedy, Marcellus H. Evans, John L. Buckley, A. Spencer Feld, John W. Gates, Leon F. Wheatley and Charles A. Freiberg changed from the Assembly to the Senate.

Note: For brevity, the chairmanships omit the words "...the Committee on (the)..."

Employees
 Clerk: Ernest A. Fay
 Sergeant-at-Arms: Charles R. Hotaling

State Assembly

Assemblymen
Note: For brevity, the chairmanships omit the words "...the Committee on (the)..."

Employees
 Clerk: Fred W. Hammond

Notes

Sources
 Members of the New York Senate (1920s) at Political Graveyard
 Members of the New York Assembly (1920s) at Political Graveyard
 COMMITTEE ASSIGNMENTS ANNOUNCED in the Plattsburgh Sentinel, of Plattsburgh, on January 14, 1927

150
1927 in New York (state)
1927 U.S. legislative sessions